Sékou Touré (born July 11, 1957 in Duékoué, Ivory Coast) is the Director of the Compliance Review and Mediation Unit (CRMU) of the African Development Bank (AFDB) and  former Conflict Resolution Commissioner of the Global Environment Facility (GEF).

Early life and family
Touré was born on July 11, 1957 in Duékoué, a town in the western region. His parents were Malinké from Odienné, in the Denguélé District, which lies in the northern part of Ivory Coast. Sékou Touré is married and has 2 children.

Education
 1989 - Ph.D. Civil & Environmental Engineering, University of New Hampshire
 1985 - M.Sc. Civil & Environmental Engineering, University of Cincinnati
 1982 - B.Sc. Civil Engineering, "École Nationale Supérieure des Traveaux Publics- ENSTP, Côte d’Ivoire

Career
 February 2001 to September 2007 - Director of the Regional Office for Africa, United Nations Environmental Programme (UNEP), Nairobi, Kenya
 March 2000 to January 2001 - Special adviser to the prime minister of Côte d’Ivoire
 February 2000 to March 2000 - Special Adviser to the Minister of State for Development Planning and Coordination of the Government of Côte d’Ivoire
 January 1996 to December 1999 - Junior Minister (High Commissioner for Hydraulics) of Côte d’Ivoire.
 Additionally, Sékou Touré has taught in the United States and Côte d’Ivoire

Tenure at GEF
On September 2007, Sékou Touré joined the Global Environment Facility (GEF), as the Conflict Resolution Commissioner. In his role, Dr. Touré provides advice and intellectual leadership on the resolution of conflicts and disputes among countries and the Global Environment Facility (GEF) agencies or its secretariat.

Dr. Touré received recognition for his contribution to the work of the Intergovernmental Panel on Climate Change (IPCC) (Nobel Peace Prize received by IPCC and Former US Vice President Al Gore Jr. in December 2007).

Sékou Touré was one of the lead authors on the IPCC Special Report on the Regional Impacts of Climate Change and Assessment on vulnerability (He is the co-author of chapter 2: Africa). He also collaborated with IPCC to develop methodologies to estimate greenhouse gas emissions. His contribution to the work of IPCC date back to when he was a professor in Ivory Coast.

Awards and honours
 Research and Teaching Assistantship, University of New Hampshire
 Summer Graduate Teaching Assistantship
 Central University Research Fund
 Fund for Dissertation Research, Sigma Xi
 Fellowship, African American Institute, New York City
 "Prix de la Recherche", Côte d’Ivoire
 "Chevalier de l'ordre du Mérite Agricole", Côte d’Ivoire
 "Diplôme d'Honneur, Fédération Nationale des Mouvements de Jeunesse Communale", Côte d’Ivoire

References

External links
 Sékou Touré tribute to Monique Barbut, the GEF CEO and Chairperson  
 Guatemalan Delegates meet with Sékou Touré
 Sékou Touré at the High-Level Africa Consultative Forum on Renewable Energy
 Sékou Touré UNFCC COP14 –Durban, South Africa, 2011
 Review of the Structure - Performance and Operating Rules and Procedures of the IRM - EO

Ivorian diplomats
University of New Hampshire alumni
University of Cincinnati alumni
1957 births
Living people
People from Montagnes District